Syria has competed at every celebration of the Mediterranean Games since the 1951 Mediterranean Games. As of 2022, the Syrian athletes have won a total of 150 medals. The country's ranking in the history of the Games is 14th place.

Medal tables

Medals by Mediterranean Games

Below lies the table representing all Syrian medals across all games. Syria has won a total of 150 medals.

Medals by sport

Medals by the Mediterranean Beach Games 

Syria won so far four medals at the Mediterranean Beach Games in which being one gold, one silver and two bronze, since their debut.

See also
 Syria at the Olympics
 Syria at the Paralympics
 Syria at the Asian Games
 Sports in Syria

References

External links
Official website, SOC

Syria at the Mediterranean Games